Rudbal Rural District is a rural district (dehestan) in the Central District of Marvdasht County, Fars Province, Iran. At the 2006 census, its population was 10,880, in 2,599 families.  The rural district has 15 villages.

References 

Rural Districts of Fars Province
Marvdasht County